Indian is a 2001 Indian Hindi-language action thriller film directed by N. Maharajan and produced by Dharmendra. It stars Sunny Deol, and also features Shilpa Shetty, Danny Denzongpa, Raj Babbar, Mukesh Rishi and Rahul Dev in other roles. The film is a remake of the Director's own Tamil film Vallarasu and was released on 26 October 2001 with excellent box office reports, grossing a domestic nett of 18.0 million on its opening day. Made on a budget of 150 million, it was successful at the box office, earning over 540 million worldwide. The film tells the story of a strong, brave policeman who is falsely blamed for the mysterious murder of his father-in-law. It was the fourth highest-grossing Hindi film of the year in India with a nett gross of 280 million.

Plot
Raj Shekhar Azad, an honest DCP whose sole intention is to wipe out corruption, emerged unflinching patriotism from his name to aim. But for every such patriot, there is an equally motivated terrorist. Waseem Khan, a dreaded terrorist is aided by Raj's father-in-law and corrupt DGP Surya Pratap Singh, many police officers and influential industrialist Shankar Singhania. Raj's path is laden with hurdles, but he leaves no stone unturned, within the realm of law, to wage a war against the evil doers.

Raj arrests Waseem and is entrusted with his interrogation. Waseem is placed in a special cell but still arranges riots in the city from within the confines of prison. Raj figures out that Surya is Waseem's accomplice. He kills Surya and performs his last rites then as his son-in-law. His wife, Anjali, is unaware of the incident and Surya's misdeeds.

Cast

Sunny Deol as DCP Rajshekhar “Raj” Azad
Shilpa Shetty as Anjali Singh Azad
Danny Denzongpa as Shankar Singhania
Mukesh Rishi as Wasim Khan/Allah Baksh (Double role)
Rahul Dev as Pratap Sinha
Raj Babbar as DGP Surya Pratap Singh
Surendra Pal as Police Commissioner
Om Puri as Joginder Singh
Rana Jung Bahadur as Havaldar Mushtaq Singh
Deepak Shirke as Uttar Pradesh minister Veer Bahadur Singh
Rajat Bedi as Sanjay Singhania
Suresh Bhagwat as B.E.S.T. employee
Salim Ghouse as Francis
Avtar Gill as Advocate Gill
Dinesh Hingoo as Jewellery shop owner
Sanjay Narvekar as Rahim
Shakti Kapoor as Rahim's father
Reema Lagoo as Mrs. Suryapratap Singh
Viju Khote as Inspector Deshmukh
Shiva Rindani as Inspector Patil
Pramod Muthu as Inspector Moutho (as Pramod Moutho)
Dhananjay Mandrekar as Inspector
Dharmesh Tiwari as Imam Saab
Sophiya Haque as an item number "Yeh Pyar"
Malaika Arora as an item number "Yeh Pyar"

Soundtrack
All songs are written by Anand Bakshi.

Reception
The website Online Bangalore described the movie as "patriotic" and described the movie as having stunts that are "vibrant and will surely appeal to the Indian masses". However they also criticised it for being overly-long, unoriginal, excessively serious, and lacking in romance. Khalid Mohammed of the Times of India described the film in an October 2001 as a "messy bang-a-bang movie".

Sequel

The making of a sequel, to be called Indian 2, and to star Sunny Deol and to be directed by Maharajan was announced in 2018.

References

External links
 

Hindi remakes of Tamil films
2001 action thriller films
2001 films
2000s Hindi-language films
Films scored by Anand Raj Anand
Fictional portrayals of the Maharashtra Police
Vijayta Films films
Films about terrorism in India
India–Pakistan relations in popular culture
Indian action thriller films
Films shot in Delhi
Films shot in Switzerland